The History Teacher is a quarterly academic journal concerned with the teaching of history in schools, colleges, and universities. It began in 1940 at the History Department at the University of Notre Dame as the Quarterly Bulletin of the Teachers' History Club.  Nuns attending the graduate history program in the summer edited and mimeographed the bulletin.  Each issue ran 20-50 pages, with informal teaching tips, evaluations of textbooks, and short thematic essays by Notre Dame professors. Its 110 subscribers were mostly teachers at Catholic high schools in the Midwest.

In 1967 Notre Dame history Professor Leon Bernard transformed the bulletin into a national quarterly journal under the current title. He brought in a national advisory board of eminent scholars. It included only one professor based in a school of education and only one from a Catholic school. The circulation climbed to 3000. In 1972 Professor Eugene L. Asher brought it to coordinating faculty members at the Department of History at California State University, Long Beach, and built a large staff and attracted essays from prominent scholars. The emphasis shifted from high school to college teachers. Asher set up the Society for History Education as official publisher outside the university chain of command, and it was the vehicle for applying for major federal grants for conferences. The subscriber base reached 4000.  Meanwhile, the American Historical Association waxed hot and cold, with many of its leaders hostile to the idea of promoting undergraduate teaching (as opposed to graduate level teaching). It gave no help.

The journal has articles on history teaching primarily at the undergraduate  level, as well as historiography covering a full range of historical topics.  It reviews textbooks and monographs of value in undergraduate education.

References

Further reading

External links

Education journals
English-language journals
History journals
Publications established in 1967
Quarterly journals